The women's 1500 metres at the 2018 IAAF World U20 Championships was held at Ratina Stadium on 12 and 15 July.

Records

Results

Heats
Qualification: First 4 of each heat (Q) and the 4 fastest times (q) qualified for the final.

Final

References

1500 metres
1500 metres at the World Athletics U20 Championships